Euosmia may refer to:

 an obsolete genus of flowering plants, whose species are now recognised as belonging to either Hoffmannia or Bothriospora
 a type of the smell disorder parosmia characterised by a pleasant smell sensation
 a rare term for a normal sensation of smell

See also 
 Eucosma, a genus of moths